Lycée Français René Goscinny de Varsovie is a French internationational school in Warsaw, Poland. It has two campuses: one houses the school administration, collège (junior high school), and lycée (senior high school). The other houses maternelle (preschool) and primaire (primary school).

References

External links

  Lycée Français de Varsovie
  Lycée Français de Varsovie

Warsaw
International schools in Warsaw